Marcel-François-Georges Delannoy (9 July 1898 – 14 September 1962) was a French composer and critic.  He wrote operas, ballets, orchestral works, vocal and chamber works, and film scores.

Life and career
Marcel Delannoy was born at La Ferté-Alais, Essonne, France.  He initially studied painting and architecture and entered the École des Beaux-Arts, but at age 20 he took up music. Having been mobilised during the First World War, he then worked as an artist. However, he was initially self-taught and never attended a conservatory, but he did receive some encouragement from Arthur Honegger (whose biography he wrote in 1953) and some lessons from Alexis Roland-Manuel and André Gedalge.  He made his name with the opera Le Poirier de misère (1927), which attracted favourable commentary from Maurice Ravel, among others.  That same year, he was one of ten composers who collaborated on a children's ballet, L'éventail de Jeanne (contributing the 'Bourrée').

In 1932, Delannoy was one of five composers approached by the producers of the film Don Quichotte for a series of songs to be sung by its star, the Russian bass Feodor Chaliapin.  The other composers invited were Ravel, Jacques Ibert, Manuel de Falla and Darius Milhaud.  Ibert's setting was chosen for the film.

He wrote criticism for Les Nouveaux temps, where he reviewed the first Paris performance of Olivier Messiaen's Quartet for the End of Time on 24 June 1941, in which he strongly objected to the written commentary accompanying the work.

The Association de Musique Contemporaine (AMC), of which Delannoy was a committee member, included his works in its early concerts of 1940-41.  He also became a member of the Groupe Collaboration. Although showing the influence of Honegger, Delannoy carved his own separate path somewhat apart from contemporary trends.

Alice Swanson Esty commissioned and premiered his song cycle La Voix du Silence (1958).

The baroque oboist and recorder player Michel Piguet (19322004) studied with Delannoy.

Delannoy married the pianist Lisette Claveau. He died in Nantes.  There is now a Rue Marcel Delannoy in his birthplace of La Ferté-Alais.

Recordings
Delannoy's Sérénade concertante for violin and orchestra (soloist Henri Merkel) and the 'Danse des Négrillons' and 'Apothéose' from La Pantoufle de vair were recorded by the Paris Conservatoire Orchestra conducted by Charles Munch in July 1941.
  
The Complainte de l'homme-serpent from the operetta Philippine was recorded by Hugues Cuénod.
Extracts from Ginèvra were recorded by the original cast of the Opéra-Comique conducted by Roger Désormière in June 1943.

Musical works

Operas
 1927: Le Poirier de misère, opéra-comique, 3 acts; 21 February 1927
 1937: Philippine, operetta, 2 acts
 1942: Ginèvra, opéra-comique, 3 acts (Paris, 25 July 1942; title role created by Irène Joachim)
 1946: Puck, opera, 3 acts, after A Midsummer Night's Dream (1949, Strasbourg; performed in Berlin in 1951)
 1953: Maria Goretti, radiophonic opera
 1962: La Nuit du temps, chamber opera

Ballets
 1927: Bourée from L'éventail de Jeanne (a ballet written in collaboration with Georges Auric, Pierre-Octave Ferroud, Jacques Ibert, Darius Milhaud, Francis Poulenc, Maurice Ravel, Alexis Roland-Manuel, Albert Roussel and Florent Schmitt)
 1930: La Fou de la dame, chanson de geste
 1935: La Pantoufle de vair, also known as Cendrillon, ballet after Charles Perrault
 1946: Les Noces fantastiques (Serge Lifar)
 1952: Travesti 
 1966: Venise seuil des eaux
 Au Royaume de la comète, ballet-cantate

Orchestral works
 1930: Figures sonores (chamber orchestra)
 1933: Symphony No. 1 
 1936: Sérénade concertante, violin and orchestra
 1940: Ballade, orchestra
 1950: Concerto de mai, Op. 50, piano and orchestra
 1954: Symphony No. 2, Op. 54, strings and celesta
 1958: Ballade concertante, piano and 12 instruments
 1958: Le Moulin de la Galette, orchestra
 Suite from Le Marchand de lunettes
 Suite from La Pantoufle de vair
 Intermezzo
 Esquisse symphonique
L'Homme danse
 Rhapsody, piano and small ensemble

Vocal works
 1933: Trois chansons de Don Quichotte, voice and orchestra (for the film Don Quichotte but not used)
 1937: Les Trois Choux de Monsieur Patacaisse, scène lyrique
 1949: Tombeau d'amour, voice and strings
 1949: Neige, voice and orchestra
 1950: État de veille, Op. 48, voice and orchestra
 1958: La Voix du Silence, song cycle
 Suite à chanter, voice and piano
 Cinq Quatrains de Francis Jammes, voice and piano

Instrumental works
 String Quartet in E major
 Diner sur l'eau, piano
 Rapsodie for trumpet, alto saxophone, cello, and piano (1934)

Film scores
 La terre est ronde (1960) (TV) 
 La Bande à papa (1956) 
 Le guérisseur (1953) 
 Malaire (1952) 
 Due sorelle amano (1950) 
 Summer Storm (1949)
 Le bateau à soupe (1947) 
 The Lost Village (1947)
 La ferme du pendu (1945; aka Hanged Man's Farm)
 Monsieur des Lourdines (1943) 
 Le marchand de notes (1942) 
 Volpone (1941) 
 Night in December (1940)
 Tempête (1940; aka Thunder Over Paris) 
 Une femme chipée (1934) 
 Il était une fois (1933; aka Once Upon a Time) 
 The Two Orphans (1933)
Source:

References

Sources
 Grove's Dictionary of Music and Musicians, 5th ed., 1954, Eric Blom, ed.
 Operaone

External links

1898 births
1962 deaths
French ballet composers
French male classical composers
French film score composers
French male film score composers
French opera composers
Male opera composers
French music critics
People from Essonne
French male non-fiction writers
20th-century French composers
20th-century French male musicians
20th-century French male writers